Oil palm refers to several palms that yield oil from fruit pulp and seeds, primarily

 Elaeis guineensis, the African oil palm, the major palm oil crop species

but also:
 Attalea maripa, the maripa palm
 Cocos nucifera, the coconut palm, which yields coconut oil from its seeds
 Elaeis oleifera, the American oil palm
 The genus Elaeis, with just two species,  E. guineensis and E. oleifera, referred to as the oil-palm genus

See also
 Wax palm

Σ
Oil palm